The Armagh-Tyrone rivalry is a Gaelic football rivalry between Irish county teams Armagh and Tyrone, who first played each other in 1890. It is considered to be one of the biggest rivalries in Gaelic games. Armagh's home ground is the Athletic Grounds and Tyrone's home ground is Healy Park.

While Tyrone have 13 Ulster titles and Armagh are ranked one below in fifth position on the roll of honour, they have also enjoyed success in the All-Ireland Senior Hurling Championship, having won 4 championship titles between them to date.

All-time results

Legend

Senior

References

External links
 "GAA: Peter Canavan and Oisin McConville discuss the intense and occasionally downright hostile Tyrone/Armagh rivalry", BBC. 18 May 2021.
 "The GAA Social: Peter Canavan and Oisin McConville pick Tyrone and Armagh early noughties dream team", BBC. 18 May 2021.

Tyrone
Tyrone county football team rivalries